Jorge Rão is a sailor from Argentina, who represented his country at the 1976 Summer Olympics in Kingston, Ontario, Canada as crew member in the Soling. With helmsman Pedro Ferrero and fellow crew member Andrés Robinson they took the 20th place.

References

Living people
Sailors at the 1976 Summer Olympics – Soling
Olympic sailors of Argentina
Year of birth missing (living people)
Argentine male sailors (sport)